Wagar may refer to:

 Kirk Wagar (born 1969), American former Ambassador to Singapore
 Kurtis Wagar (born 1985), Canadian retired lacrosse goaltender
 Margaret Wagar (1902–1990), American bridge player
 Wagar Women's Knockout Teams, a bridge competition
 Wagar Women's Pairs, a bridge competition
 Mortimer Wagar (1857–1926), American banker and businessperson
 W. Warren Wagar (1932–2004), American historian
 Wagar High School, in Côte Saint-Luc, Quebec, Canada

See also
Trentway Wagar, intercity bus carrier in Ontario, Canada